Frances Anne "Peggy" Jackson (born 1951) is a former Archdeacon of Llandaff.

She was educated at Somerville College, Oxford and became a chartered accountant. She was ordained deacon in 1987 and priest in 1994. After a curacy in Ilkeston she held incumbencies in Hemel Hempstead and Mortlake until her appointment as Archdeacon. She was collated on 31 May 2009. She retired on 31 July 2021.

References

1951 births
Living people
Alumni of Somerville College, Oxford
British accountants
Archdeacons of Llandaff